Ronald "Ron" Davis (born 1937) is an American painter whose work is associated with geometric abstraction, abstract illusionism, lyrical abstraction, hard-edge painting, shaped canvas painting, color field painting, and 3D computer graphics. He is a veteran of nearly seventy solo exhibitions and hundreds of group exhibitions.

Life

Born in Santa Monica, California, he was raised in Cheyenne, Wyoming. In 1955–56 he attended the University of Wyoming. In 1959 at the age of 22 he became interested in painting. In 1960–64 he attended the San Francisco Art Institute. Abstract expressionism, the prevailing artistic movement of the time, would have an influence on many of his future works.  In 1962 he was a Yale-Norfolk Summer School Grantee. In 1963 his paintings became hard-edged, geometric and optical in style, and by 1964 his works were shown in important museums and galleries. He lived and worked in Los Angeles, 1965–71, and in Malibu, California, 1972–90. Since 1991 he has lived and worked in Arroyo Hondo on the outskirts of Taos, New Mexico.

Career
Ronald Davis from the earliest days of his career had a significant impact on contemporary abstract painting of the mid-1960s. According to art critic Michael Fried:

He had his first one-person exhibition at the Nicholas Wilder Gallery in Los Angeles in 1965.

Barbara Rose wrote an in depth essay about Davis' paintings of the 1960s in the catalogue accompanying an exhibition of his Dodecagon Series in 1989 in Los Angeles. Among other observations she wrote:

In an Artforum article in 1970 artist/art critic Walter Darby Bannard commented: "Though Davis is plagued by 'series' ideas, and has yet to get a grip on the inherent monumentality of his style, he is young and inspired, and these things will evolve naturally." From 1966 to 1972 Ron Davis created geometric shaped, illusionistic paintings using polyester resins and fiberglass. About Davis' paintings of the late 1960s in an essay accompanying the Ronald Davis retrospective exhibition Forty Years of Abstraction, at the Butler Institute of American Art in 2002, the abstract painter Ronnie Landfield wrote: "the Dodecagons from 1968–69 remain among the most visually stunning, audacious and intellectually interesting bodies of work made by an abstract painter in the last half of the twentieth century."

In 1966 Davis was an instructor at the University of California, Irvine. Also in that year he had his first one-man exhibition at the Tibor de Nagy Gallery in New York City and a solo exhibition at Leo Castelli Gallery in 1968.

His works are held in the collections of the Museum of Modern Art in New York City, the Tate Gallery, London, the Los Angeles County Museum of Art and the Art Institute of Chicago and he has been awarded a National Endowment for the Arts grant. Since the 1990s, he has worked in digital painting and digital art.

See also
Digital art
Digital painting

References

Citations

Works cited

Further reading

 Photos and article on Ron Davis’ Studio.

External links

Ronald Davis in the National Gallery of Australia's Kenneth Tyler Collection

1937 births
Living people
20th-century American painters
20th-century American printmakers
21st-century American painters
21st-century American male artists
Abstract painters
American male painters
Artists from New Mexico
People from Taos County, New Mexico
San Francisco Art Institute alumni
University of Wyoming alumni
20th-century American male artists